The Albert Halls are a concert and conference venue on Dumbarton Road, in Stirling, Scotland. 

The building was designed by William Simpson in 1881 and opened in October 1883. It was designated as a Category B Listed Building in 1978.

References

External links
Culture Stirling

Buildings and structures in Stirling (city)
Tourist attractions in Stirling (council area)